Moyto Airport is an airstrip serving Moyto (or Moïto), a town in the Hadjer-Lamis Region of Chad.

Facilities 

References 

Airports in Chad
Hadjer-Lamis Region